Caleta Herradura Formation is a geologic formation of Late Miocene (Montehermosan) age, cropping out on the Mejillones Peninsula in northern Chile. The erosion at the Coastal Cliff of northern Chile have created particularly good exposures of Caleta Herradura Formation. The formation deposited in a half graben within Mejillones Peninsula. The formation rests nonconformably on the Jorgino Formation.

Fossil content 
The following fossils have been found in the formation:

See also 

 Cerro Ballena
 Coquimbo Formation
 Navidad Formation
 Pisco Formation

References

Further reading 
 S. D. Emslie and C. G. Correa. 2003. A new species of penguin (Spheniscidae: Spheniscus) and other birds from the late Pliocene of Chile. Proceedings of the Biological Society of Washington 116(2):308-316

Geologic formations of Chile
Miocene Series of South America
Pliocene Series of South America
Neogene Chile
Montehermosan
Sandstone formations
Mudstone formations
Conglomerate formations
Paleontology in Chile
Geology of Antofagasta Region
Geology of the Chilean Coast Range